Mancos State Park is a Colorado state park. It is located near Mesa Verde National Park, the West Mancos Trail and the San Juan Skyway. The park is known to have been a dwelling place for Ancestral Puebloans.  They lived in the Four Corners area in ancient times from AD 1 to 1300. It was also later controlled by the Spanish for 200 years from the 17th to the 19th century.

In 1948 the U.S. Bureau of Reclamation commissioned the Jackson Gulch Dam, and it was officially included as a part of the Colorado state parks in 1987.

References

External links
 
 

State parks of Colorado
Protected areas of Montezuma County, Colorado
Protected areas established in 1987
Dams completed in 1949
Dams in Colorado
United States Bureau of Reclamation dams